Chilvers is a surname. Notable people with the surname include:
 Colin Chilvers, English film director and special effects coordinator
 Liam Chilvers, English footballer
Noah Chilvers, English footballer
 Peter Chilvers, engineer
 Peter Chilvers (musician)